The women's football tournament at the 2017 Southeast Asian Games was the tenth women's SEA Games football tournament. The tournament was held in Malaysia from 20 to 28 August 2017 where five teams participated in a round-robin format. There were no age restrictions on women's teams.

Vietnam won the tournament for the fifth time, after waiting for eight years since their last victory in the 2009 Southeast Asian Games.

Competition schedule
The following was the competition schedule for the women's football competitions:

Participating nations
The following five teams participated for the competition.

  (MAS)
  (MYA)
  (PHI)
  (THA)
  (VIE)

Venues

The tournament was held in two venues:
UiTM Stadium, Shah Alam
UM Arena Stadium, Kuala Lumpur

Squads

Results 
All times are Malaysia Standard Time (UTC+8).

Winners

Goalscorers
6 goals

 Win Theingi Tun

5 goals

 Khin Moe Wai

4 goals

 Rattikan Thongsombut

3 goals

 Orathai Srimanee
 Huỳnh Như
 Nguyễn Thị Muôn

2 goals

 Nisa Romyen
 Nguyễn Thị Liễu
 Phạm Hải Yến

1 goal

 Dadree Rofinus
 Naw Ar Lo Wer Phaw
 Yee Yee Oo
 Patrice Impelido
 Hali Long
 Camille Rodriguez
 Naphat Seesraum
 Pitsamai Sornsai
 Saowalak Pengngam
 Taneekarn Dangda
 Nguyễn Thị Bích Thùy
 Nguyễn Thị Tuyết Dung
 Vũ Thị Nhung

Own goal

 Nur Athinah Farhanah

See also
Men's tournament

References

External links
Official website

Women's tournament
2017 in women's association football